Athienemanniidae is a family of mites belonging to the order Trombidiformes.

Genera:
 Africasia Viets, 1931
 Anamundamella Cook, 1992
 Athienemannia Viets, 1920
 Bleptomundamella Cook, 2001
 Chelohydracarus Smith, 1998
 Chelomideopsis Romijn, 1920
 Davecookia Harvey, 2003
 Janszoonia Smit, 2007
 Mellamunda Harvey, 1988
 Mundamella Viets, 1913
 Notomundamella Cook, 1986
 Penemundamella Cook, 2001
 Phreatohydracarus Tanasachi & Orghidan, 1955
 Platyhydracarus Smith, 1989
 Plaumannia Lundblad, 1936
 Stygameracarus Smith, 1990
 Stygohydracarus Viets, 1932

References

Trombidiformes